Provincial routes (also referred to as major regional routes) are the second category of road in the South African route-numbering scheme. They are designated with the letter "R" followed by a number from 21 to 82, formerly with the letter "P" followed by a number from 66. They serve as feeders to the national routes and as trunk roads in areas where there is no national route.

Designation as a provincial route does not necessarily imply that a road is maintained by the road authority in the provincial government; some parts of the provincial route network are maintained by the National Roads Agency (SANRAL), and parts in towns may be ordinary streets maintained by the municipal roads departments. Provincial routes vary in quality from gravel roads (for example the R31 between Askham, Northern Cape, and Hotazel) to freeways (for example the R59 between Vereeniging and Johannesburg).

List of routes

Images

See also
 National routes (South Africa)
 Regional routes (South Africa)
 Municipal Routes in Gauteng (disambiguation)

References

Provincial routes in South Africa
South Africa